China Poly Group Corporation is a state owned Chinese business group among 102 central state owned enterprises under the supervision of State-owned Assets Supervision and Administration Commission of the State Council (SASAC).

It is both primarily engaged in representing the Chinese defense manufacturing industry in international sales and the world's third largest art auction house (behind Sotheby's and Christie's).

History
With the approval of the State Council, China Poly Group Corp. was set up on the basis of Poly Technologies, Inc. in February 1992. Poly Technologies was formed in 1984 as an arms-manufacturing wing of the People's Liberation Army.

Procurement actions during the COVID-19 pandemic

Group entities were active in procurement during the COVID-19 pandemic. Figures from China Customs show that some 2.46 billion pieces of epidemic prevention and control materials had been imported between 24 January and 29 February, including 2.02 billion masks and 25.38 million items of protective clothing valued at 8.2 billion yuan ($1 billion). Press obtained internal documents showing that the group, together with other Chinese companies and state-owned enterprises – such as Country Garden and Greenland Holdings – had an important role in scouring markets in countries around the world to procure essential medical supplies and equipment. The company said its operation was staff-led, and was "driven out of pure compassion for our people who have friends and family in the Wuhan region".

Subsidiaries
 Poly Property
 Poly Real Estate
 Poly Technologies
 Poly Culture
 Poly Theatre
 Poly Auction

References

External links

 
Conglomerate companies of China
Government-owned companies of China
Companies based in Beijing
Conglomerate companies established in 1993
Chinese companies established in 1993
Defence companies of the People's Republic of China